Bucculatrix ilecella is a moth in the family Bucculatricidae. It is found in North America, where it has been recorded from Texas. It was first described by August Busck in 1915.

The wingspan is 4-4.4 mm. The forewings are white, obscured by a dusting of minute to dark-tipped scales. The hindwings are pale silvery grey in females and darker grey in males. There are two generations per year.

The larvae feed on Ilex species. Pupation takes place in a white cocoon.

References

Natural History Museum Lepidoptera generic names catalog

Bucculatricidae
Moths described in 1915
Moths of North America